Slim, as a nickname, may refer to:

 Salvacion "Slim" Lim-Higgins (1920–1990), Filipino fashion designer
 Slim Barrett (born 1960), Irish jewelry designer and artist
 Slim Dunlap (born 1951), American rock guitarist and singer-songwriter
 Slim Dusty (1927–2003), Australian country music singer-songwriter
 Slim Gaillard (1916–1991), American jazz singer, songwriter, pianist and guitarist
 Slim Harriss (1897–1963), American Major League Baseball pitcher
 Slim Jones (1913–1938), American Negro league pitcher
 Slim Keith, Lady Keith (1917–1990), American socialite and fashion icon
 Slim Love (1890–1942), American Major League Baseball pitcher
 Slim Moon (born 1967), record producer and musician
 Amarillo Slim Preston (1928–2012), American professional gambler
 Slim Sallee (1885–1950), American Major League Baseball pitcher
 Slim Shady (born 1972), alternate stage name of Eminem, American rapper
 Slim Smith (1948–1973), Jamaican ska, rocksteady and reggae singer
 Slim Summerville (1892–1946), American actor
 Slim Whitaker (1893–1960), American actor
 Slim Whitman (1893–1960), American singer-songwriter
 Slim Wilson (1910–1990), American country music singer, songwriter, bandleader, and radio and TV personality
 Slim Wintermute (1917–1977), American basketball player

See also
 Slim Jim (disambiguation)

Lists of people by nickname